The 2012 Shoot Out (officially the 2012 PartyPoker.com Snooker Shoot Out) was a professional non-ranking snooker tournament that took place between 27 and 29 January 2012 at the Circus Arena in Blackpool, England. It was played under a variation of the standard rules of snooker.

Nigel Bond was the defending champion, but he lost in the round one 15–30 against Robert Milkins in a repeat of the 2011 final.

Barry Hawkins won the final 1-0 (61–23) against Graeme Dott.

Prize fund

Winner: £32,000
Runner-up: £16,000
Semi-finals: £8,000
Quarter-finals: £4,000
Last 16: £2,000
Last 32: £1,000
Last 64: £500

Highest break: £2,000
Total: £130,000

Draw
The draw for round 1 was made on 6 November 2011, on the second day of the World Seniors Championship. The draw for each round up to and including the semi-finals were random, conducted live at the venue. All matches were a single . All times are GMT.

Main draw

Top half

Bottom half

Final

Century breaks

 135  Martin Gould
 121  Stephen Lee

Notes
 Originally Jamie Cope was scheduled to play against Neil Robertson, but Robertson withdrew due to a chest infection and was replaced by Ian McCulloch.
 Originally Matthew Selt was scheduled to play against Joe Jogia, but Jogia withdrew due to a knee injury, and was replaced by Rod Lawler.

References

External links
 Facebook: Day 1
 Facebook: Day 2 – Last 64
 Facebook: Day 2 – Last 32
 Facebook: Day 3 – Last 16
 Facebook: Day 3 – Quarters, Semis and Final

2012
Snooker Shoot-Out
Snooker Shoot-Out
Sport in Blackpool